Hanna-Elisabeth Müller (born 3 May 1985  at Mannheim) is a German soprano in opera, concert and recitals.

Life

Musical education 
As a child, Müller took violin lessons with Dinu Hartwich and later joined a choir. Since the age of 11, she took vocal lessons with Judith Janzen to sing solo parts. In 1998, she performed the boy soprano in Leonard Bernstein's MASS during the Kultursommer Ludwigshafen. She continued singing as a hobby during her high school education and earned several prizes in the junior musician's competition Jugend musiziert.

Early career 
Following her high school degree, she studied vocal arts in the soloist class of former opera singer Rudolf Piernay at the Hochschule für Musik und Darstellende Kunst Mannheim. To complete her studies, she attended master classes of Dietrich Fischer-Dieskau, Júlia Várady, Edith Wiens, Elly Ameling, Thomas Hampson and Wolfram Rieger.

In the song duo competition 2009 at Enschede, Netherlands, she gained, together with her accompanist Mihaela Tomi, the highest award, the audience award and the award for the best interpretation of a contemporary opus. In 2010 she gained the 1st prize in the competition Ton und Erklärung – Werkvermittlung in Musik und Wort of the Kulturkreis der Deutschen Wirtschaft. This award was given by a jury of nine experts chaired by Francisco Araiza and attests that she is not only able to perform music on the highest level but also to explain it convincingly. In 2011, she obtained awards in the Ada Sari International Vocal Art Competition at Nowy Sącz.

Her first stage debuts in important roles were Euridice in Orfeo ed Euridice (April 2010) at Kammeroper Rheinsberg and Pamina in Die Zauberflöte (November 2011) at Theater & Philharmonie Thüringen, Gera. She also represented this role at the Teatro dell'Opera di Roma in March 2012. On 22 December 2013 she was featured by Rolando Villazón in the series Stars de Demain by Arte.

Bavarian State Opera 

At the Bavarian State Opera, Munich, Müller was member of the opera studio in the season 2010/11 and member of the company from the season 2012/2013 to 2015/2016. This resulted in a number of successful role debuts, e.g. as Gretel in Hänsel und Gretel (March 2013), Zerlina in Don Giovanni (May 2013), Susanna in Le nozze di Figaro (September 2013), Sophie in Werther (October 2015) und Marzelline in Fidelio (February 2016). Furthermore, she presented roles which she already had performed at other opera houses, i.e. Zdenka in Andreas Dresen's new production of Arabella during Munich Opera Festival in July 2015 and Sophie in Der Rosenkavalier in July 2016. In 2013 she obtained the "Festspielpreis der Gesellschaft zur Förderung der Münchner Opernfestspiele".

Other opera houses 

On 12 April 2014 she debuted as Zdenka in Arabella by Richard Strauss during the Salzburg Easter Festival. She was on stage together with Renée Fleming and Thomas Hampson and convinced the audience as well as the critics. This success was crucial for the election as Nachwuchskünstlerin des Jahres (upcoming artist of the year) by the critics of the journal Opernwelt. As Zdenka she also debuted at the Semperoper Dresden in November 2014. On 5 September 2015 she debuted as Sophie in Der Rosenkavalier at De Nederlandse Opera Amsterdam.

In 2017 Müller passed important milestones of her international career, namely her debut at the Metropolitan Opera, New York, as Marzelline in Jürgen Flimm's production of Fidelio (March 2017), and at La Scala, Milan, where she had her role debut as Donna Anna in Don Giovanni. Her first performance at Zürich Opera House was in February 2018 in the new role of Ilia in Idomeneo,

Oratorios and recitals 

Beside her engagements at opera houses, Müller frequently sings in recitals and oratorios. Sponsoring by Südwestrundfunk in the SWR2 New Talent Program from 2013 to 2015 gave her the opportunity to reach a broad audience with the audio transmissions of two song recitals. One of them was her debut at Schwetzinger Festspiele, together with the pianist Juliane Ruf, on 26 May 2013.

In October 2014 she sang the soprano solo in Ein deutsches Requiem by Johannes Brahms in a performance transmitted by 3sat together with the WDR Symphony Orchestra and Jukka-Pekka Saraste. In China she was featured by Staatskapelle Dresden during their concert tour in November 2015, singing the soprano part of the Symphony No. 4 by Gustav Mahler. In March 2016 she debuted with Four Last Songs by Richard Strauss in concerts of the Orquesta Sinfónica del Principado de Asturias at Bilbao (Spain) and with the WDR Symphony Orchestra at Viersen and Duisburg. In the opening concert of Salzburg Festival 2016 she sang the soprano part (Gabriel and Eva) in The Creation by Joseph Haydn, and in the season opening concert at Philharmonie de Paris in September 2016 she debuted as Gretchen in Szenen aus Goethes Faust by Robert Schumann. On 11 January 2017 she replaced at short notice the indisposed Camilla Tilling at the opening concert of the Elbphilharmonie Hamburg for in the fourth movement of Beethoven's Symphony No. 9.

Record Label 
In 2019 Hanna-Elisabeth Müller, has signed an exclusive, multi-album agreement with Pentatone.

Repertoire 

Müller performed the following roles in well-renowned opera houses:

 Berta (Il Barbiere di Siviglia), Bavarian State Opera, Munich
 Donna Anna (Don Giovanni), Teatro alla Scala, Milano
 Donna Clara (Der Zwerg), Bavarian State Opera, Munich
 Eurydice (Orfeo ed Euridice), Kammeroper Schloss Rheinsberg, Germany
 Gretel (Hänsel und Gretel), Bavarian State Opera, Munich
 Ilia (Idomeneo), Zürich Opera House
 Marzelline (Fidelio), Bavarian State Opera, Munich; Metropolitan Opera, New York
 Pamina (Die Zauberflöte), Teatro dell'opera di Roma; Bavarian State Opera, Munich; Royal Festival Hall, London (concert staging)
 Prinzessin (L'enfant et les sortilèges), Bavarian State Opera, Munich
 Servilia (La clemenza di Tito), Bavarian State Opera, Munich
 Sophie (Der Rosenkavalier), De Nederlandse Opera, Amsterdam; Bavarian State Opera, Munich
 Sophie (Werther), Bavarian State Opera, Munich
 Susanna (Le nozze di Figaro), Bavarian State Opera, Munich
 Woglinde (Das Rheingold, Götterdämmerung), Bavarian State Opera, Munich
 Zdenka (Arabella), Großes Festspielhaus, Salzburg; Semperoper, Dresden; Bavarian State Opera, Munich
 Zerlina (Don Giovanni), Bavarian State Opera, Munich

Her concert repertoire includes the soprano parts of numerous oratorios and masses als well as orchestral songs and concert arias from Baroque to Late Romanticism, for example The Creation and the Missa in angustiis (Nelsonmesse) by Joseph Haydn, the Missa Solemnis by Ludwig van Beethoven, the fifth movement "Ihr habt nun Traurigkeit" of A German Requiem by Johannes Brahms, the fourth movement of the 4th Symphony by Gustav Mahler, songs by Franz Schubert as orchestrated by Felix Mottl, Seven Early Songs by Alban Berg and Four Last Songs by Richard Strauss.

In recitals, which were broadcast by Südwestrundfunk, she performed songs by Benjamin Britten, Francis Poulenc, Robert Schumann, Richard Strauss, William Walton and Hugo Wolf.

Discography

Audio 
 Mass No. 3 in f minor by Anton Bruckner, Hanna-Elisabeth Müller, Anke Vondung, Dominik Wortig, Franz-Josef Selig, Chor des Bayerischen Rundfunks, Bamberger Symphoniker, Robin Ticciati. Tudor, April 2014.
 "Traumgekrönt"; songs by Richard Strauss, Arnold Schönberg and Alban Berg. Hanna-Elisabeth Müller, soprano; Juliane Ruf, piano. Belvedere, June 2017.
 Gustav Mahler, Symphony No. 4 in G major. Hanna-Elisabeth Müller, Soprano; Duisburger Symphoniker, Ádám Fischer. CAvi, August 2017.
 Richard Strauss, Der Rosenkavalier. Hanna-Elisabeth Müller as Sophie, Camilla Nylund as Marschallin, Paula Murrihy as Oktavian, Peter Rose as Baron Ochs von Lerchenau. Netherlands Philharmonic Orchestra, Marc Albrecht. Live recording of September 2015, Challenge Classics, September 2017.
 "Reine de coeur", Hanna-Elisabeth Müller soprano, Juliane Ruf piano (Francis Poulenc, Robert Schumann, Alexander von Zemlinsky), February 2020, Pentatone
 "Sinnbild Strauss Songs", Hanna-Elisabeth Müller soprano, WDR Symphony Orchestra under the baton of Christoph Eschenbach, June 2022, Pentatone

DVD 
 Richard Strauss: Arabella. Live recording of Salzburg Easter Festival 2014 with Hanna-Elisabeth Müller as Zdenka, Renée Fleming as Arabella, Thomas Hampson as Mandryka, Daniel Behle as Matteo. Stage director: Florentine Klepper. Sächsischer Staatsopernchor and Staatskapelle Dresden under the direction of Christian Thielemann. Unitel Classica, September 2014.
 Johannes Brahms: Ein Deutsches Requiem. Live recording of a concert in Stift St. Florian, August 2016, with Hanna-Elisabeth Müller, soprano, Simon Keenlyside, baritone, the Cleveland Orchestra and the Wiener Singverein conducted by Franz Welser-Möst. Concorde, January 2017.
 Inauguration concert of the Elbphilharmonie, Hamburg. Hanna-Elisabeth Müller as the soprano soloist in the fourth movement of Beethoven's Symphony No. 9. NDR Elbphilharmonie Orchester under the baton of Thomas Hengelbrock. CMajor, June 2017.

References

External links 

Website of Hanna-Elisabeth Müller
Official biography of Hanna-Elisabeth Müller on the website of her agency (KünstlerSekretariat am Gasteig, Munich)

1985 births
Living people
Musicians from Mannheim
German operatic sopranos
21st-century German  women  opera singers